Cherie Jones is a Barbadian attorney and writer. Her debut novel, How the One-Armed Sister Sweeps Her House, was short-listed for the 2021 Women's Prize for Fiction.

Biography 
Cherie Jones was born in 1974. After receiving her LLB from the University of the West Indies in 1995, she was admitted to the Bar in Barbados in 1997. She graduated in 2015 from the Master of Arts writing program at Sheffield Hallam University and is currently pursuing a PhD in creative writing. In addition to her writing, she works as the general counsel for a government agency in Barbados. How the One-Armed Sister Sweeps Her House was chosen as for the Good Morning America monthly book club in February 2021. 

Jones is a single mother of four children and has spoken openly about being a survivor of domestic violence. In addition to her novel, she also authored the short story collection, The Burning Bush Women & Other Stories, published in 2004.

Works

References 

1974 births
Living people
21st-century Barbadian women writers
21st-century Barbadian writers